Kalyvia is an Aromanian (Vlach) village of the Elassona municipality. Before the 2011 local government reform it was part of the municipality of Olympos. The 2011 census recorded 467 inhabitants in the village. Kalyvia is a part of the community of Kokkinopilos. Kalyvia is a village in Elassona, in Larissa, in the Central Greece Region of Greece.

Population
According to the 2011 census, the population of the settlement of Kalyvia was 467 people, a decrease of almost 4% compared with the population of the previous census of 2001.

History
Kalyvia was founded during the Ottoman rule of Greece by Vlachs from Kokkinopilos. After World War II and the burning of Kokkinopilos Kalyvia was made a permanent settlement in 1950's.

See also
 List of settlements in the Larissa regional unit

References

Aromanian settlements in Greece
Populated places in Larissa (regional unit)